The  is a 0.4 km light rail line owned by Iyotetsu. The line runs entirely within the city of Matsuyama, Ehime Prefecture, Japan. Opened in 1947, the line connects Iyotetsu's heavy rail hub at Matsuyama City Station to the rest of the light rail network.

Operations
The line is electrified and is double-tracked for the entire line. Four light rail services, along with the heritage railway train Botchan, run on the line.

Stations
: Stations served by the heritage railway train Botchan

References

Railway lines in Japan
Rail transport in Ehime Prefecture
Railway lines opened in 1947